Splicing factor, arginine/serine-rich 3 is a protein that in humans is encoded by the SFRS3 gene.

Browser View
UCSC Genome Browser View

UCSC Gene details page

Interactions
SFRS3 has been shown to interact with RBM7.

References

Further reading